West Stockwith is a village within the Bassetlaw district of Nottinghamshire, England. West Stockwith is an ecclesiastical parish in the Church of England Diocese of Southwell and Nottingham with the parish church of St Mary the Virgin's Church, West Stockwith being built in 1722.

East Stockwith is a settlement on the other side of the Trent, but within the county boundaries of Lincolnshire. The two villages were once linked together by a passenger ferry.

Etymology
Unlike other places in the region which have "with" in their names, which is usually from Old Norse víðr "wood", cognate with Old English wudu "wood", the second element here is Old Norse vað "ford, river crossing", as seen in Wath upon Dearne. The first element is less clear: it is either Old English stocc "tree-trunk" or stoc "village, outlying farmstead" (as seen in Stoke-on-Trent and Stoke Poges. The name was recorded as Wessockiv in 1139.

West Stockwith today
Today West Stockwith is a village with one main street and a few side roads, one cul-de-sac of  former farm-workers' houses and another the former vicarage. There are signs still of its industrial past with the well-preserved Water Lanes which allow access from the road to the banks of the River Trent, even via a ginnel under part of one property. The industry related to the River has gone, so too the original work related to the Chesterfield Canal which reaches the Trent at the Basin. This is now the home of river cruisers and narrow boats for hire and for leisure. The river was once home to many of the workers and there were once more than eleven public houses, many in the front rooms of today's cottages, which still contain evidence of their past use. Only two pubs remain although the Yacht Club in the basin caters to boat owners and holds various events over the year. The Hospital Day which was traditionally held in July to raise money by children dressing up and decorating floats, usually farmers' wagons, is no more. Of the industry that replaced that related to the water, there are local grass and potato merchants and the former Trent-side Chemical works is now an industrial park with a variety of businesses, from engineering and motor-cycle related works to some boat building enterprises. The White Hart public house opened the Idle Brewery in 2007 and sells to other pubs in the area and elsewhere. The school has also closed and both that building and the former masters' premises are now private houses.

References

External links

Villages in Nottinghamshire
Civil parishes in Nottinghamshire
Bassetlaw District